The 16th Artillery Division() was a military formation of the People's Liberation Army of the People's Republic of China.

The formation of the division started on November 9, 1969. On December 29, 1969, the activation was complete. The division was formally activated on February 15, 1970.

The division was then composed of:
Division Headquarters - Jiexiu, Shanxi Province
61st Artillery Regiment (122mm Howitzer Type-54 * 36) - Pingyao, Shanxi Province
62nd Artillery Regiment (122mm Howitzer Type-54 * 36) - Fenyang, Shanxi Province
63rd Artillery Regiment (122mm Gun Type-59 * 36) - Xiaoyi, Shanxi Province
64th Artillery Regiment (122mm Gun Type-59 * 36) - Lingshi, Shanxi Province
212th Artillery Regiment (130mm MRL Type-63 * 36) - Jiexiu, Shanxi Province

The division was a part of the Artillery of the Beijing Military Region.

In May 1972, the 64th Artillery Regiment was reequipped with 152mm Gun-Howitzer Type-66.

On April 1, 1983, the division was attached to 63rd Army Corps' control.

In 1985, the division was reduced and reorganized as the Artillery Brigade, 63rd Army():
The 61st, 64th, and a part of the 212th Artillery Regiments were detached from the division in August 1985.
Artillery Brigade, 63rd Army was formally activated on October 5, 1985.

The brigade was transferred to the 27th Army following 63rd's inactivation in 2003, during which it was renamed as the Artillery Brigade, 27th Army().

In April 2017 the brigade was disbanded along with the 27th Army.

References

Artillery divisions
Land forces divisions of the People's Liberation Army
Military units and formations established in 1949
Military units and formations disestablished in 2017
1949 establishments in China
2017 disestablishments in China